Kölbingen is an Ortsgemeinde – a community belonging to a Verbandsgemeinde – in the Westerwaldkreis in Rhineland-Palatinate, Germany.

Geography

Location
Kölbingen lies roughly 4 km west of Westerburg, in a hollow between the Geisenwald and the Ruhscheid. Since 1972 it has belonged to what was then the newly founded Verbandsgemeinde of Westerburg, a kind of collective municipality.

Constituent communities
Kölbingen's Ortsteile (divisions) are Schönberg, Möllingen and Kölbingen.

History
In 1494, Kölbingen had its first documentary mention.

Politics

The municipal council is made up of 16 council members, including the extraofficial mayor (Bürgermeister), who were elected in a majority vote in a municipal election on 26 May 2019.

Economy and infrastructure

West of the community runs Bundesstraße 255, leading from Montabaur to Herborn. The nearest Autobahn interchange is Diez on the A 3 (Cologne–Frankfurt). The nearest InterCityExpress stop is the railway station at Montabaur on the Cologne-Frankfurt high-speed rail line.

References

External links
Kölbingen 
Kölbingen in the collective municipality’s Web pages 

Municipalities in Rhineland-Palatinate
Westerwaldkreis